Ann Ayscough Sands (January 5, 1761July 17, 1851) was an American educator. She was the founder of the first public school ever established in Brooklyn, New York. St. Ann's Church, the first Episcopal church in that city, was named in her honor.

Biography
Ann Ayscough was born in New York City, January 5, 1761. Her father, Dr. Richard Ayscough, was a surgeon in the British army, and her mother was a Langdon, while a still more remote ancestor was a Cuyler, one of the original Dutch settlers from Holland. She was married to Joshua Sands, March 9, 1780. In 1813, she was the principal founder and the first directress of the Loisian Seminary and therefore, indirectly, was the founder of the first public school ever established in Brooklyn. She was also the president of the Brooklyn Dorcas Society. She died of a pulmonary affection on July 17, 1851, at the age of 90. She had twelve children, six of whom preceded her in death.

References

Attribution

Bibliography
 
 

1761 births
1851 deaths
Educators from New York City
Founders of schools in the United States
American women educators
People of the Province of New York
Women founders